Daniel Coulter Reynolds (born July 14, 1987) is an American singer and songwriter. He is the lead vocalist of the pop rock band Imagine Dragons. Reynolds also released an EP in 2011, titled Egyptian – EP, as a duo with his former wife Aja Volkman under the moniker Egyptian. He is a recipient of the Songwriters Hall of Fame Hal David Starlight Award.

Early life
Reynolds was born in Las Vegas, the seventh of nine children (eight boys and one girl) of Christene M. (née Callister) and Ronald Reynolds, a lawyer and author. Both are natives of Nevada, and Reynolds is a 4th generation Nevadan. As a Boy Scout he earned the rank of Eagle Scout in 2005. Reynolds was a member of the Church of Jesus Christ of Latter-day Saints (LDS Church). When he was 19 years old he volunteered full-time as a missionary in Nebraska for two years.

Reynolds wrote the song "I Bet My Life" celebrating and reflecting on his enduring relationship with his parents.  Following his graduation from Bonanza High School, he attended University of Nevada, Las Vegas (after losing his ecclesiastical endorsement for Brigham Young University) and then transferred to BYU after serving an LDS mission, where he studied communications, marketing, and music and excelled academically. While at BYU, he formed Imagine Dragons and won the school's battle of the bands competition before leaving to pursue music full-time.

Career

Imagine Dragons (2008–present)

Reynolds was initially reluctant to become a professional musician, partially because future bandmate Wayne Sermon had once told him: "Don't do music because you want to do music - do music if you have to do music". After he began attending Brigham Young University, Reynolds found that he could not "do anything else" and committed fully to a professional music career. In Utah, Reynolds met and recruited drummer Andrew Tolman to form Imagine Dragons. With Reynolds as lead vocalist, Imagine Dragons won BYU's "Battle of the Bands" and other local competitions. Bassist Ben McKee joined the band in Las Vegas and after Tolman's departure 2011 invited Daniel Platzman, also a friend of Wayne's from Berklee College of Music, to play drums, thus completing the group's current lineup. The band relocated to Las Vegas, where they began performing almost nightly as a lounge act. It was there in 2009 that they caught their first big break when Train's frontman, Pat Monahan, fell sick just prior to the Bite of Las Vegas Festival. Imagine Dragons were called to fill in for them and performed in front of a crowd of more than 26,000 people. In November 2011, they signed with Interscope Records and began working with Grammy award-winning producer Alex da Kid.

Imagine Dragons released their debut studio album Night Visions on September 4, 2012. The album was preceded by their first single "It's Time",  released on August 18, 2012. Night Visions charted in the top ten albums in the U.S. in 2012, 2013, and 2014. It won a Billboard Music Award for Top Rock Album and was nominated for a Juno Award for International Album of the Year. The album's second single, "Radioactive", reached No. 3 on the Billboard Hot 100. "Radioactive" set the all-time record for the longest reign at the top of the Billboard Rock Songs chart, with 23 consecutive weeks. It also broke the all-time record for longest run on the Billboard Hot 100, with 87 weeks, a record that would remain unbroken until The Weeknd's smash single “Blinding Lights” charted for an 88th week on the Billboard Hot 100 in August 2021. Rolling Stone called it "the biggest rock hit of the year". It is the best-selling rock song in digital history, with sales of more than 7.5 million copies in the United States, and was certified diamond by the RIAA. The third single, "Demons", reached No. 6 on the Billboard Hot 100 and is the eighth best-selling rock song in digital history with sales in excess of 5 million copies in the United States. Imagine Dragons were nominated for two Grammy Awards, Record of the Year and Best Rock Performance; they won the latter. They also won two AMAs for Favorite Alternative Artist, a Teen Choice Award for Choice Rock Group, a World Music Award for World's Best Rock Act, and a Billboard Music Award for Top Rock Artist. The band made their major festival headlining debut at the Made In America Music Festival in 2014 and also drew large crowds and positive reviews at festivals such as Lollapalooza Brazil in 2014.

Imagine Dragons released their second album, Smoke + Mirrors, in February 2015. Smoke + Mirrors debuted at number one on the Billboard 200, UK Albums Chart, and Canadian Albums Chart. Two of the album's four singles, "I Bet My Life" and "Shots", charted on the Billboard Hot 100.

Imagine Dragons released their third album Evolve on June 23, 2017.  Evolve debuted at number two on the Billboard 200 and number one on the Canadian Albums Chart.  Singles "Believer", "Thunder", and "Whatever It Takes", each of which have charted at number 4, number 4, and number 12 on the Billboard Hot 100, respectively. Believer topped the Billboard Hot Rock Songs (29 weeks), Alternative Songs (13 weeks), and Adult Top 40 charts.  Thunder also topped the Billboard Hot Rock Songs (22 weeks so far) and Alternative Songs chart (3 weeks so far), as well as the Mainstream Top 40 chart.  Whatever It Takes topped the Billboard Rock Songs chart (17 weeks so far) and Alternative Songs chart (3 weeks).  In 2018, the band was nominated for two more Grammy Awards and received the iHeartRadio Music Award for Alternative Rock Artists of the Year.

Imagine Dragons released their fourth studio album Origins on November 9, 2018. The album debuted at number two on the Billboard 200. The singles "Natural" and "Bad Liar" peaked at number #13 and #56 on the Billboard Hot 100, respectively.

Imagine Dragons released their fifth studio album Mercury - Act 1 on September 3, 2021. The album debuted at number nine on the Billboard 200. The singles "Follow You" and "Enemy" peaked at number #68 and #5 on the Billboard Hot 100, respectively. Mercury - Act 2, their sixth studio album, was released on July 1, 2022. The single "Bones" peaked at number #47 on the Billboard Hot 100.

Egyptian (2010)
Reynolds was invited to perform an opening set for Nico Vega in 2010; this was when he met Aja Volkman, the group's lead singer. He asked her to help him finish some demos he was developing. The two began collaborating, and formed Egyptian. They recorded, produced, and independently released a four track eponymous EP digitally. They have only performed this material once live.

X Ambassadors (2013) 
In 2013, Reynolds discovered the unsigned alternative band X Ambassadors. After connecting with the band, he brokered a record deal for them with KidinaKorner/Interscope Records. Dan co-wrote a few songs on their debut album VHS, which has gone on to achieve Platinum certification by the RIAA.

Night Street Records and LOVELOUD (2016–present) 

In 2016, Reynolds formed Night Street Records, an imprint label under Interscope Records. His first signing was alternative hip-hop artist K.Flay.

He organized the charity festival LOVELOUD, held August 26, 2017 in Orem, to "fight against teen suicide and to bring communities [...] and encourage acceptance" of LGBTQ youth. The concert donated the profits to LGBT organizations The Trevor Project, GLAAD, and others. Performing acts included Imagine Dragons, Neon Trees, Krewella, Joshua James, and Nicholas Petricca (of Walk the Moon). The film Believer, centering on LGBTQ youth suicides in Utah, and the LOVELOUD concert, premiered at Sundance on January 20, 2018, and on HBO on June 25, 2018.

A second LOVELOUD festival was held on July 28, 2018, at Rice-Eccles Stadium in Salt Lake City. Acts included Imagine Dragons, Zedd, Mike Shinoda (of Linkin Park), Grace VanderWaal, Tyler Glenn (of Neon Trees), Vagabon, A.W., and Cameron Esposito. An estimated 35,000 people attended the 2018 event and raised approximately a million dollars for the various charities. The event was live streamed for free on YouTube, sponsored by AT&T. During his appearance at the 2018 festival, Utah's Lieutenant Governor Spencer Cox announced Governor Gary Herbert's declaration of July 28, 2018, as "LoveLoud Day in Utah."

The third LOVELOUD festival occurred on June 29, 2019, at USANA Amphitheater in   West Valley City. In addition to Reynolds, featured performers included Kesha, Daya, Tegan & Sara, PVRIS, K. Flay, and many others. Martin Garrix was also originally booked to perform; however, due to an injury, was unable to attend the festival. In his absence, Indie Pop band AJR made an appearance and entertained fans with hits such as 100 Bad Days, Weak, Burn the House Down, and Don't Throw Out My Legos. Former BYU mascot and dancer, Charlie Bird, also performed a choreographed number along with some dancers from the BYU Cougarettes. Other notable speakers included Reynold's wife, Aja Volkman, Shannon Beveridge and X González.

Influences
Reynolds cites Arcade Fire, Nirvana, Muse, The Beatles, Paul Simon, Coldplay, Linkin Park, Harry Nilsson, and U2 as some of his and the band's artistic influences. He credits bands like Foster the People and Mumford & Sons for bringing alternative pop music to a new level of commercial success in recent years.

Personal life
On March 5, 2011, Reynolds married Aja Volkman. The two have three daughters and a son. Their first daughter was born on August 18, 2012. Their fraternal twin daughters were born on March 28, 2017. Their son was born on October 1, 2019.

On April 26, 2018, Reynolds announced that after just over seven years of being married, he and Volkman would divorce. However, on November 7, 2018, Reynolds announced, along with the release of the Imagine Dragons song "Bad Liar", that he and Volkman never went through with the divorce, that she helped co-write the song with him earlier in the year, and they were together once again. However, on September 16, 2022, Reynolds announced that he and Volkman were again separating.

Reynolds suffers from ankylosing spondylitis, which he announced at Leeds First Direct Arena in 2015 during the band's Smoke + Mirrors tour. In 2016 he partnered with Novartis's ThisASLife to raise awareness about the severe inflammatory disease. During the same year, Reynolds said in an interview that he had been heavily depressed for the past two years and often sees a therapist. He has also suffered from ulcerative colitis since the age of 21. Many songs on Night Visions were inspired by his depression. He aims to destigmatize and change how society sees depression and the act of seeking professional help. In April 2018, he began to talk about his physical and mental health struggles on his social media accounts and continues to offer encouraging messages of support to his fans and others struggling as well.

Reynolds and his mother Christene appear in the Paramount+ series From Cradle to Stage, hosted by Dave Grohl and his mother Virginia Hanlon Grohl. The Reynolds episode aired on May 6, 2021.

Reynolds grew up in the Church of Jesus Christ of Latter-day Saints, identified as a member as of 2019, and stated he had doctrinal disagreements with the church's stance on homosexuality. During a 2021 interview with Attitude he described himself as "non-Mormon"; the following month, he stated "I'm not raising my kids in any religiousness if that means anything. I'm more spiritual based and religion hasn't really been my cup of tea."

Discography

Studio albums
 Night Visions (2012)
 Smoke + Mirrors (2015)
 Evolve (2017)
 Origins (2018)
 Mercury – Act 1 (2021)
 Mercury – Act 2 (2022)

Filmography

Awards and nominations

Songwriters Hall of Fame
Hal David Starlight Award (2014)

Additional honors
Trevor Hero Award (2017)

Philanthropy
Since 2013, Imagine Dragons along with the family of Tyler Robinson formed and support The Tyler Robinson Foundation, helping young people battling cancer. During the foundation's 2018 annual gala, it raised $2.1 million to support young people battling cancer. Imagine Dragons have also partnered with Do The Write Thing: National Campaign to Stop Violence (presided over by Reynolds' uncle), Amnesty International's "Bringing Human Rights Home", OneOrlando Fund's "All Is One Orlando Unity Concert", and Crackle's "Playing It Forward" (S1 E2).

In 2015, Imagine Dragons released the track "I Was Me" with all proceeds going to the One4 project to help fleeing refugees, particularly in the Middle East. He also helped organize the LoveLoud Fest to benefit LGBTQ organizations.

Notes

References

External links

1987 births
21st-century American singers
Activists from Nevada
Alternative rock singers
Alternative rock guitarists
American indie rock musicians
American male singers
American Mormon missionaries in the United States
American pop rock singers
American LGBT rights activists
Feminist musicians
Former Latter Day Saints
Grammy Award winners
Imagine Dragons members
Male feminists
Musicians from Las Vegas
Living people
People with ankylosing spondylitis
American people of British descent
American people of Scottish descent
American people of Irish descent
American people of Danish descent